Dibekacin (3',4'-dideoxykanamycin B) is an aminoglycoside antibiotic. It is a semisynthetic derivative of kanamycin developed by Hamao Umezawa and collaborators for Meiji Seika.

It has been used in combination with sulbenicillin.

References

Aminoglycoside antibiotics